Turckheim (Alsatian: Tercka) is a commune in the Haut-Rhin department in Grand Est in north-eastern France. It lies west of Colmar, on the eastern slopes of the Vosges mountains.

History
Archeological finds indicate the area was already inhabited during Ancient Rome. When the Germanic tribes invaded and crossed the Rhine, the Thuringii settled here and possibly gave their name to the town, which was first Thorencohaime and then Thuringheim. During the High Middle Ages Thuringheim is listed as belonging partly to the abbey of Munster and partly to the manor of Haut-Landsberg, centered in Kientzheim.

Turckheim became a free imperial city in 1312, and in 1315, the construction of ramparts was begun, which are still in good condition. It already had city rights and market rights in 1354, and from 1354 to 1679, Turckheim was part of the Décapole, a league of ten free imperial cities of the Holy Roman Empire. After the Peace of Westphalia (1648), Turckheim and the other Alsatian towns refused to swear allegiance to the French king.

During the Franco-Dutch War, the village of Turckheim was taken by French armies, led by Henri de La Tour d'Auvergne, Viscount of Turenne, which subsequently defeated armies of Austria and Brandenburg in what became known as the Battle of Turckheim (1675). Features of the village of Turckheim, especially the gates, help to identify the town in a fan currently in the Fan Museum in Greenwich, England. In 1678, with the signing of the Treaties of Nijmegen, the French king assumed control over Turckheim.

In 1871, at the end of the Franco-Prussian War, the town, with the rest of the Alsace, became part of the German Empire. In 1918, it reverted to France.

Turckheim is one of only a few remaining towns in France with a municipal night watchman, who makes the rounds at 10 p.m. between 1 May and 31 October and on the three Saturdays preceding Christmas. Maintained for tourist reasons, the position commemorates the 13th-century night watchman who prevented a fire.

Geography

Turckheim lies in the valley of the river Fecht, downstream from Munster. It is 6 km west of the city centre of Colmar.

Climate
Turckheim has a oceanic climate (Köppen climate classification Cfb).

Notable residents
 Victor Sieg (1837 – 1899), composer and organist, was born in Turckheim. Rue Victor Sieg is named in his honour.

See also
 Communes of the Haut-Rhin department

References

External links

Turckheim & Trois-Epis (french)

1648 disestablishments
States and territories established in 1312
Communes of Haut-Rhin
Populated places established in the 1310s
Former republics
Décapole
Haut-Rhin communes articles needing translation from French Wikipedia